Fishhook Ridge is a ridge rising to about  on the east side of Sobral Peninsula, Nordenskjöld Coast, Antarctica. It was named by the UK Antarctic Place-Names Committee in 1990 from the shape of the feature in plan view.

References 

Ridges of Graham Land
Nordenskjöld Coast